Maksim Sergeyevich Bukatkin (born 16 July 1985) is a Russian professional football coach and a former player.

Coaching career
On 12 April 2018, he was appointed manager of FC Ararat Moscow.

References

External links
 
 

1985 births
Living people
Russian footballers
Association football midfielders
People from Noginsk
Meistriliiga players
Russian expatriate footballers
Expatriate footballers in Estonia
FC Dynamo Vologda players
FC Sheksna Cherepovets players
FC Saturn Ramenskoye players
JK Narva Trans players
Russian football managers
FC Ararat Moscow managers
FC Znamya Truda Orekhovo-Zuyevo players
Sportspeople from Moscow Oblast
Russian expatriate sportspeople in Estonia